The Nokia 6670 is a smartphone from Nokia announced on September 24, 2004. Based on the Series 60 platform on Symbian OS, the phone is a tri-band more conservatively styled business version of the fashion-oriented Nokia 7610, and features a 1.0 megapixel digital camera, 8MB of storage (as well as RS-MMC expansion slot) and a 65,536 colour 176x208 TFT screen. Software includes viewers for Microsoft Word, Excel, PowerPoint and PDF files, a full HTML compatible web browser, and a GPS-like application that generates positioning information from the GSM cell data. The Series 60 platform allows for many programs to be added, and also with the inclusion of Java Apps and Games. Its 123 MHz ARM-9 processor can handle many applications at a time, and it can calculate 16000 fibonacci numbers in 35 seconds, as calculated using FPC Bench.

Today, it is one of the rarest Nokia devices.

Related handsets 
 Nokia 6600
 Nokia 6620
 Nokia 6630
 Nokia 7610
 Nokia 6680/81/82

References

External links 
 Nokia 6670 - Official Nokia webpage.
 DP Software - FPC Bench

Nokia smartphones